The Project Management Body of Knowledge (PMBOK) is a set of standard terminology and guidelines (a body of knowledge) for project management. The body of knowledge evolves over time and is presented in A Guide to the Project Management Body of Knowledge (PMBOK Guide), a book whose seventh edition was released in 2021. This document results from work overseen by the Project Management Institute (PMI), which offers the CAPM and PMP certifications.

Much of the PMBOK Guide is unique to project management such as critical path method and work breakdown structure (WBS). The PMBOK Guide also overlaps with general management regarding planning, organising, staffing, executing and controlling the operations of an organisation. Other management disciplines which overlap with the PMBOK Guide include financial forecasting, organisational behaviour, management science, budgeting and other planning methods.

History

Earlier versions of the PMBOK Guide were recognized as standards by the American National Standards Institute (ANSI) which assigns standards in the United States (ANSI/PMI 99-001-2008) and the Institute of Electrical and Electronics Engineers (IEEE 1490-2011).

The evolution of the PMBOK Guide is reflected in editions of the Guide.

Purpose 
The PMBOK Guide is intended to be a "subset of the project management body of knowledge that is generally recognized as a good practice. 'Generally recognized' means the knowledge and practices described are applicable to most projects most of the time and there is a consensus about their value and usefulness. 'Good practice' means there is a general agreement that the application of the knowledge, skills, tools, and techniques can enhance the chance of success over many projects." This means that sometimes the "latest" project management trends, often promoted by consultants, may not be part of the latest version of The PMBOK Guide.

However, the 6th Edition of the PMBOK Guide now includes an "Agile Practice Guide"

Contents 
The PMBOK Guide is process-based, meaning it describes work as being accomplished by processes. This approach is consistent with other management standards such as ISO 9000 and the Software Engineering Institute's CMMI. Processes overlap and interact throughout a project or its various phases.

 Inputs (documents, plans, designs, etc.)
 Tools and Techniques (mechanisms applied to inputs)
 Outputs (documents, plans, designs, etc.)

A Guide to the Project Management Body of Knowledge — Sixth Edition provides guidelines for managing individual projects and defines project management related concepts. It also describes the project management life cycle and its related processes, as well as the project life cycle. and for the first time it includes an "Agile Practice Guide".

The PMBOK as described in the Guide recognizes 49 processes that fall into five basic process groups and ten knowledge areas that are typical of most projects, most of the time.

Process groups 
The five process groups are:
 Initiating: processes performed to define a new project or a new phase of an existing project by obtaining authorization to start the project or phase.
 Planning: Those processes required to establish the scope of the project, refine the objectives, and define the course of action required to attain the objectives that the project was undertaken to achieve.
 Executing: Those processes performed to complete the work defined in the project management plan to satisfy the project specifications
 Monitoring and Controlling: Those processes required to track, review, and regulate the progress and performance of the project; identify any areas in which changes to the plan are required; and initiate the corresponding changes.
 Closing: Those processes performed to finalize all activities across all Process Groups to formally close the project or phase.

Knowledge areas 
The ten knowledge areas, each of which contains some or all of the project management processes, are:

 Project Integration Management : the processes and activities needed to identify, define, combine, unify, and coordinate the various processes and project management activities within the project management process groups.
 Project Scope management : the processes required to ensure that the project includes all the work required, and only the work required, to complete the project successfully.
 Project Schedule Management : the processes required to manage the timely completion of the project. Until the 6th edition of the PMBOK Guide this was called "Project Time Management"
 Project Cost Management : the processes involved in planning, estimating, budgeting, financing, funding, managing, and controlling costs so that the project can be completed within the approved budget.
 Project Quality Management : the processes and activities of the performing organization that determine quality policies, objectives, and responsibilities so that the project will satisfy the needs for which it was undertaken.
 Project Resource Management : the processes that organize, manage, and lead the project team. Until the 6th edition of the PMBOK Guide this was called "Project Human Resource Management"
 Project Communications Management : the processes that are required to ensure timely and appropriate planning, collection, creation, distribution, storage, retrieval, management, control, monitoring, and the ultimate disposition of project information.
 Project Risk Management : the processes of conducting risk management planning, identification, analysis, response planning, and controlling risk on a project.
 Project Procurement Management : the processes necessary to purchase or acquire products, services, or results needed from outside the project team.  Processes in this area include Procurement Planning, Solicitation Planning, Solicitation, Source Selection, Contract Administration, and Contract Closeout.
 Project Stakeholder Engagement : the processes required to identify all people or organizations impacted by the project, analyzing stakeholder expectations and impact on the project, and developing appropriate management strategies for effectively engaging stakeholders in project decisions and execution.

Each of the ten knowledge areas contains the processes that need to be accomplished within its discipline in order to achieve effective project management.  Each of these processes also falls into one of the five process groups, creating a matrix structure such that every process can be related to one knowledge area and one process group.

Extensions 
While the PMBOK Guide is meant to offer a general guide to manage most projects most of the time, there are currently three official extensions: 
 Software Extension to the PMBOK Guide 
 Construction Extension to the PMBOK Guide 
 Government Extension to the PMBOK Guide

Criticism and alternatives
The PMBOK is a widely accepted standard in project management, however there are alternatives to the PMBOK standard, and PMBOK does have its critics.  One thrust of critique has come from the critical chain developers and followers (e.g. Eliyahu M. Goldratt and Lawrence P. Leach), as opposed to critical path method adherents. The PMBOK Guide section on Project Time Management does indicate Critical Chain as an alternative method to Critical Path. 

A second strand of criticism originates in Lean Construction. This approach emphasises the lack of two way communication in the PMBOK model and offers an alternative which emphasises a language/action perspective and continual improvement in the planning process.

See also
 ISO 10006 for Quality Management on Projects
 ISO 21500 for Project Management
 ISO 31000 for Risk Management
 Pmhub
 PMP
 PRINCE2

References

External links 
 PMBOK webpage by the Project Management Institute
 PMBOK Summarized - A remarkbly concise guide to the PMBOK (PDF)
 US DoD extension to PMBOK Guide (PDF)

1987 documents
1996 non-fiction books
2013 non-fiction books
2017 non-fiction books
Project management
Bodies of knowledge